Allenoconcha retinaculum is a species of air-breathing land snail, a terrestrial pulmonate gastropod mollusc in the family Euconulidae. 

This species is endemic to Norfolk Island.

References

External links
 Preston, H. B. (1913). Characters of new genera and species of terrestrial Mollusca from Norfolk Island. The Annals and magazine of natural history; including zoology, botany, and geology. Eighth series. 12 (72): 522-538. London
 Köhler, F.; Bouchet, P. (2020). On unavailable genus-group names introduced by Tom Iredale for Australian non-marine gastropods: nomenclatural clarifications and descriptions of new genera. Molluscan Research. 40(2): 150–159

Allenoconcha
Gastropods of Norfolk Island
Vulnerable fauna of Australia
Gastropods described in 1913
Taxonomy articles created by Polbot
Taxobox binomials not recognized by IUCN